Hung Thinh Land is a real estate developer in Vietnam. Founded in 2002 by entrepreneur Nguyễn Đình Trung, it is a subsidiary of Hung Thinh Corporation.

According to a report by Vietcombank Securities, from 2016 to the first half of 2020, the company accounted for 4% of the residential real estate market share in Vietnam, making it the 2nd largest real estate developer in Vietnam at that time.

By the end of June 2020, statistics from Hanoi Stock Exchange showed that Hung Thinh Land’s equity had reached a total of VND 6,084 billion.

As of May 2021, the company is reported by VnExpress to own 4,500 hectares of land in Ho Chi Minh City and the neighboring provinces.

See also
 Vinhomes
 Vingroup
 Sun Group (Vietnam)

References

External links
Official website
Hung Thinh Land on Phnom Penh Post
Hung Thinh Land on DealStreetAsia

Real estate companies of Vietnam
2002 establishments in Vietnam
Companies based in Ho Chi Minh City